Multnomah County, Oregon, the city of Portland, Oregon, and Metro (Oregon regional government) held elections on May 16 and November 7, 2006.

In the May primary, political newcomer Ted Wheeler unseated County Chair Diane Linn with 69% of the vote; incumbent Sheriff Bernie Giusto retained his post with 61% of the vote, defeating Donald DuPay and write-in candidate Paul van Orden, who won 11% of the vote; Lavonne Griffin-Valade defeated outgoing Representative Steve March as County Auditor; and a county ballot measure passed. Incumbent Portland City Commissioners Dan Saltzman and Erik Sten both kept their seats, though Sten narrowly avoided a runoff election.

In the general election, Jeff Cogen defeated Lew Frederick to succeed Serena Cruz on the County Commission; Cheryl Albrecht, Judith Hudson-Matarazzo, and Leslie Roberts each won contested races for the Circuit Court. Several countywide ballot measures appeared on the ballot as well.

(MD) indicates an endorsement from Multnomah Democrats.

City of Portland 
Portland, Oregon City Council

Council Position 2 (incumbent: Sten) 
won in primary:

 Erik Sten (MD)

lost in primary:
 Emilie Boyles (MD)
 Ginny Burdick
 Dave Lister

Council Position 3 (incumbent: Saltzman) 
won in primary:

 Dan Saltzman

lost in primary:
 Amanda Fritz (MD)
 Lucinda Tate
 Chris Iverson
 Sharon Nasset
 Michael Casper
 "Watchman"

Metro 
Metro (Oregon regional government)

Metro Councilor from District 1 
won in primary:

 Rod Park

lost in primary:
 Jim Duncan

Metro Councilor from District 4 
won in November General Election:

 Kathryn Harrington

lost runoff race in November General Election:
 Tom Cox
lost in Primary:
 Al Young 
 Kathy Christy

Auditor 
won in primary:

 Suzanne Flynn (was formerly Multnomah County Auditor; term limits prevented her from running for that position again.)

lost in primary:
 Alexis Dow (incumbent)

Multnomah County

County Commission

Chair (incumbent: Diane Linn) 
won in Primary:

 Ted Wheeler

lost in Primary:
 Diane Linn (MD)
 Terrence R. Smyth

District 2 (incumbent: Serena Cruz) 
NOTE: Serena Cruz is unable to run due to term limit law.

runoff in November General Election:

 Jeff Cogen (Endorsed by the Oregonian & Willamette Week - view complete list)
 Lew Frederick (MD)

lost in primary:
 Alexander "Xander" Patterson
 Gary Hansen (MD)

County Auditor 
won in Primary:

 LaVonne Griffin-Valade (web site)

lost in Primary:
 Steve March (MD)

Sheriff (incumbent: Bernie Giusto) 
won in primary:

Bernie Giusto

lost in primary:
 Donald L. DuPay
 Paul Van Orden (write-in candidate, received endorsement from Willamette Week; received about 10% of vote)

Circuit Court Judge 
Elections for the Multnomah County Circuit Court (Oregons fourth judicial district) were unusually dynamic. Circuit court judges in Oregon are normally appointed by the governor of Oregon, and subsequently run for re-election as incumbents, rarely facing opposition. In 2006, three races were contested or competitive.

Position 31 was vacated by the retirement of Judge David Gernant; five candidates competed in the May primary election, with Cheryl Albrecht and Kathleen Payne advancing to the runoff in the general election. Albrecht won in November with 54% of the vote.

Position 28 opened with the death of Judge Cliff Freeman shortly before the filing deadline. Ten candidates filed for the seat (though Trung Tu, who had previously run for Position 31, withdrew his candidacy). Judith Hudson Matarazzo won the election.

Position 37 was the subject of great controversy. Youlee Yim You had been appointed by Governor Ted Kulongoski on August 9, 2006. Oregon law requires appointees to run for election after their appointment, so You filed for election, and was expected to be on the ballot as the incumbent. Leslie Roberts, a former neighbor of You, filed to oppose her, and then made a complaint that You was not qualified to run (due to a rule about the duration of her residence in Oregon). You's name was removed from the ballot.

Charles Henderson then entered the race as a write-in candidate. Roberts, who was unopposed on the ballot, won the race; Henderson won 23% of the vote. You was later re-appointed, and won election to a six-year term in 2008.

District 4

See also 
 Oregon's statewide elections, 2006
 Oregon gubernatorial election, 2006
 United States House of Representatives elections in Oregon, 2006
 Oregon primary election, 2006

References

External links 
 Primary election results
 General election results
 Oregon Bluebook: Multnomah County
 County web site
 County web site candidate list
 Multnomah Democrats
 Unofficial election results from May 16 Primary: http://www.co.multnomah.or.us/dbcs/elections/2006-05/results.shtml

2006 Oregon elections